The earliest known California earthquake was documented in 1769 by the Spanish explorers and Catholic missionaries of the Portolá expedition as they traveled northward from San Diego along the Santa Ana River near the present site of Los Angeles. Ship captains and other explorers also documented earthquakes.  As Spanish missions were constructed beginning in the late 18th century, earthquakes records were kept. After the missions were secularized in 1834, records were sparse until the California Gold Rush in the 1840s. From 1850–2004, there was about one potentially damaging event per year on average, though many of these did not cause serious consequences or loss of life.

Since the three damaging earthquakes that occurred in the American Midwest and the East Coast (1755 Cape Ann, 1811–12 New Madrid, 1886 Charleston) were well known, it became apparent to settlers that the earthquake hazard was different in California. While the 1812 San Juan Capistrano, 1857 Fort Tejon, and 1872 Owens Valley shocks were in mostly unpopulated areas and only moderately destructive, the 1868 Hayward event affected the thriving financial hub of the San Francisco Bay Area, with damage from Santa Rosa in the north to Santa Cruz in the south. By this time, scientists were well aware of the threat, but seismology was still in its infancy. Following destructive earthquakes in the late 19th and early 20th centuries, real estate developers, press, and boosters minimized and downplayed the risk of earthquakes out of fear that the ongoing economic boom would be negatively affected.

According to seismologist Charles Richter, the 1906 San Francisco earthquake moved the United States Government into acknowledging the problem. Prior to that, no agency was specifically focused on researching earthquake activity. The United States Weather Bureau did record when they happened and several United States Geological Survey scientists had briefly disengaged from their regular duties of mapping mineral resources to write reports on the New Madrid and Charleston events, but no trained geologists were working on the problem until after 1906 when the Coast and Geodetic Survey was made responsible. The outlook improved when Professor Andrew Lawson brought the state's first monitoring program online at the University of California, Berkeley in 1910 with seismologist Harry Wood, who was later instrumental in getting the Caltech Seismological Laboratory in Pasadena operational in the 1920s.

Early developments at the Caltech lab included an earthquake observation network using their own custom-built short-period seismometers, the Richter magnitude scale, and the Modified Mercalli intensity scale (an updated version of the Mercalli intensity scale). In 1933, the Long Beach earthquake occurred in a populated area and damaged or destroyed many public school buildings in Long Beach and Los Angeles. Some decades later, the San Fernando earthquake affected the San Fernando Valley north of Los Angeles with heavy damage to several hospitals. In both cases, the perception of California policy makers changed, and state laws and building codes were modified (with much debate) to require commercial and residential properties to be built to withstand earthquakes. Higher standards were established for fire stations, hospitals, and schools, and construction of dwellings was also restricted near active faults.

Tectonic setting

During the last 66 million years, nearly the entire west coast of North America was dominated by a subduction zone, with the Farallon Plate subducting beneath the North American Plate. Presently, the Juan de Fuca Plate (with its Explorer and Gorda satellite plates) and the Rivera and Cocos Plates are the only remnants of the once much larger Farallon Plate. The plate margin that remains in California is that of the strike-slip San Andreas Fault (SAF), the diffuse Pacific–North American plate boundary that extends east into the Basin and Range Province of eastern California and western Nevada (a seismically active area called Walker Lane) and southwest into the California Continental Borderland region off the central and southern coasts. This system of faults terminates in the north at the Mendocino Triple Junction, one of the most seismically active regions in the state, where earthquakes are occasionally the result of intraplate deformation within the Gorda Plate. It terminates in the south at the Salton Sea where displacement transitions to a series of spreading centers and transform faults, beginning with the Brawley Seismic Zone in the Imperial Valley.

In the San Francisco Bay Area, the San Andreas system of faults spans offshore and into the East Bay area, with the bulk of the faults lying to the east of the main SAF. There is a 70% probability that one of these faults will generate a 6.7 Mw or greater earthquake before 2030, including the Hayward Fault Zone, which has gone beyond its average return period of 130 years ( as of  ). While the SAF is quiet north of San Francisco , the central SAF segment near San Juan Bautista is where aseismic creep was first studied, and to the south is where the recurring Parkfield earthquakes occur. The secondary faults lay to the west of the main SAF at the extreme southern portion, including the active and young San Jacinto Fault Zone, which may be taking over as the primary boundary south of Cajon Pass. Near the Transverse Ranges, reverse and thrust faults have produced damaging earthquakes in Santa Barbara and the San Fernando Valley.

Notable earthquakes

See also
Alquist Priolo Special Studies Zone Act
California earthquake forecast
Field Act
Geography of California
Geology and geological history of California
Southern California Earthquake Center
Timeline of the Portolá expedition

References

Sources

Further reading

External links

Information by Region-California – USGS
Southern California Earthquake Data Center
Putting Down Roots in Earthquake Country – Earthquake Country Alliance
Broadband Seismic Data Collection Center –  University of California, San Diego
What Will Happen After The 'Big One' Hits SoCal? – KCET
Little-known quake, tsunami hazards lurk offshore of Southern California – American Geophysical Union
California’s other drought: A major earthquake is overdue – The Conversation
New California bill aims to create a public inventory of collapse-risk buildings – Temblor, Inc.

 
Earthquakes
Earthquakes

California
Tsunamis in the United States